Leave It to Beaver is an American television situation comedy that follows the misadventures of a suburban boy, his family and his friends. It stars Barbara Billingsley, Hugh Beaumont, Tony Dow and Jerry Mathers ("as The Beaver", as the opening credits put it).

CBS first broadcast the show on October 4, 1957, but dropped it after one season. ABC picked it up and ran it for another five years, from October 2, 1958, to June 20, 1963. It proved to be a scheduling challenge for both networks, airing on four different evenings (Wednesday through Saturday). It was produced by Gomalco Productions (1957–1961) and by Kayro Productions (1961−1963), and distributed by Revue Studios.

Leave It to Beaver never broke into the Nielsen Ratings top 30 in its six-season run.  However, it proved to be much more popular in reruns. It also led to an unsuccessful 1997 film of the same name.

Premise
The show is built around young Theodore "Beaver" Cleaver (Jerry Mathers) and the trouble he gets himself into while navigating his way through an often-incomprehensible, sometimes-illogical world. Supposedly, when he was a baby, his older brother Wallace "Wally" (Tony Dow) mispronounced "Theodore" as "Tweedor". Their firm-but-loving parents, Ward (Hugh Beaumont) and June Cleaver (Barbara Billingsley), felt "Beaver" sounded better.  Conversely, Mathers has said that the real reason for the name "Beaver" is that one of the show's writers, Joe Connelly, had a shipmate named "The Beaver" in World War II; from that came the family's name, "Cleaver."

Beaver's friends include the perpetually apple-munching Larry Mondello (Rusty Stevens) in the early seasons, and, later, Gilbert Bates (Stephen Talbot), as well as the old fireman, Gus (Burt Mustin). His sweet-natured-but-no-nonsense elementary school teachers are Miss Canfield (to whom Beaver declares his love in the episode entitled "Beaver's Crush") (Diane Brewster), Miss Landers (Sue Randall) and  Mrs. Rayburn (Doris Packer), also the school's principal. In the early seasons, Beaver's nemesis in class is Judy Hensler (Jeri Weil).

Beaver's brother Wally is popular with both peers and adults, getting into trouble much less frequently. He letters in three sports.  He has little difficulty attracting girlfriends, among them Mary Ellen Rogers (Pamela Baird) and Julie Foster (Cheryl Holdridge). His pals include the awkward Clarence "Lumpy" Rutherford (Frank Bank) and smart aleck Eddie Haskell (Ken Osmond), the archetype of the two-faced wise guy, a braggart among his peers and an obsequious yes man to the adults he mocks behind their backs. Eddie often picks on the Beaver.
 
The family lives in the fictional town of Mayfield. Beaver attends Grant Ave. Grammar School, and Wally, Mayfield High School (after graduating from Grant Ave. in season one).

Cast

Main characters
 Barbara Billingsley as June Cleaver. Billingsley has said that June Cleaver's wardrobe was more than a fashion statement. The pearl necklace hid a hollow (caused by a surgical scar) in her neck which would have caused shadows and high-heeled shoes were employed to offset the boys' growing height.
 Hugh Beaumont as Ward Cleaver. Before he made Ward Cleaver his acting trademark, Beaumont sometimes played villains in film and television. He directed a number of Leave It to Beaver episodes in the last two seasons, including the final one, the retrospective "Family Scrapbook".
 Tony Dow as Wally Cleaver.
 Jerry Mathers as Theodore "Beaver" Cleaver. The casting directors noticed that Mathers was uneasy at the auditions and asked him where he would rather be. Mathers replied that he would rather be at his Cub Scout den meeting, where he was going after the audition. That boyish innocence got Mathers the part of Beaver.

Supporting characters
 Ken Osmond as Eddie Haskell.
 Diane Brewster as Miss Canfield (October 4, 1957–March 21, 1958 air dates), Beaver's first teacher at Grant Ave. Grammar School. Brewster also played Miss Simms in the pilot episode.
 Sue Randall as Miss Alice Landers (October 16, 1958–June 20, 1963), Beaver's teacher, replacing Miss Canfield.
 Doris Packer as Mrs. Rayburn, Beaver's first teacher and later the principal of Grant Ave. Grammar School
 Stephen Talbot as Gilbert Bates (March 19, 1959–June 6, 1963). Before settling in Mayfield, the Bates family traveled a lot due to Gilbert's father's work, and "Gil," as his father John Bates calls him, tends to make up stories about his family in order to get his classmates to accept him.
 Rusty Stevens as Larry Mondello. (November 22, 1957–1960)
 Richard Correll as Richard Rickover. (April 30, 1960–October 18, 1962)
 Stanley Fafara as Hubert "Whitey" Whitney. (October 4, 1957–June 6, 1963)
 Jeri Weil as Judy Hensler. (October 4, 1957–October 15, 1960)
 Burt Mustin as Gus the fireman, head of Auxiliary Firehouse No. 7 (October 4, 1957–February 24, 1962)
 Frank Bank as Clarence "Lumpy" Rutherford.
 Richard Deacon as Fred Rutherford, Lumpy's pompous, demanding father and Ward Cleaver's equally pompous, smug co-worker.
 Buddy Hart as Chester Anderson.
 Tiger Fafara as Tooey Brown. Tiger is Stanley's brother.
 Pamela Baird as Mary Ellen Rogers (April 16, 1958–June 20, 1963), Wally's first girlfriend.
 Cheryl Holdridge as Julie Foster (January 7, 1961–April 11, 1963), another of Wally's girlfriends

Episodes

The pilot, titled "It's a Small World", aired on April 23, 1957.  It featured Max Showalter (credited as Casey Adams) as Ward Cleaver, and Paul Sullivan as Wally Cleaver. TBS re-aired the pilot on October 4, 1987, to commemorate the show's 30th anniversary. TV Land re-aired it on October 6, 2007, as part of their twenty-four-hour marathon to commemorate the show's 50th anniversary. It is also available as a bonus episode on the season-one DVD. 234 episodes followed.

A voice-over by Hugh Beaumont precedes each episode in the first season, providing a background to that episode's theme, though these are omitted in airings on TV Land.

Opening titles
Season one: The characters are not shown. A drawing of a street, viewed from above, displays the credits in wet concrete.

Season two: Ward and June, standing at the bottom of the stairs, see the boys off to school as they come down the stairs and exit the front door.

Season three: Ward and June enter the boys' bedroom to wake them up.

Season four: Ward and June open the front door and stand on the stoop. As Wally, followed by Beaver, leave for school, June hands them their lunches and Ward gives them their jackets.

Season five: June takes refreshments out to the men out in the front yard.

Season six: June, carrying a picnic basket, walks out the front door towards the car. Ward, carrying another item for the picnic, is next, followed in quick succession by Wally. Beaver, lagging behind, runs out, slamming the door behind him. Ward, with June in the passenger seat and the boys in back, then reverses toward the camera.

Musical theme
The show's playfully-bouncy theme tune, which became as much of a show trademark as Beaver's baseball cap or Eddie Haskell's false obsequiousness, was "The Toy Parade," composed by David Kahn, Melvyn Leonard, and Mort Greene. For the final season, however, the song was given a jazz-like arrangement by veteran composer / arranger Pete Rugolo.

Syndication
Reruns of the show became part of CBS affiliates' lineups in the mornings for several years to come. TBS showed it for many years in the late 1980s, and it currently airs on TV Land—where it has been shown since July 1998. Today, NBC Universal Television owns the syndication rights and all properties related to the series.

Spinoffs
A made-for-television reunion movie, Still the Beaver, appeared in 1983. The main original cast appeared, except for Beaumont, who had died the previous year. Ward Cleaver was still a presence, however: the film's story used numerous flashbacks to the original show, as it followed young-adult Beaver's struggle to reconcile divorce and newly minted single fatherhood, straining to cope by what his father might or might not have done, while facing the possibility of his widowed mother selling their childhood home. June Cleaver is later elected to the Mayfield City Council.

Its reception led to a new first-run, made-for-cable series, The New Leave It to Beaver (1985–1989), with Beaver and Lumpy Rutherford running Ward's old firm (where Lumpy's pompous, demanding father — played by Richard Deacon in the original series — had been the senior partner), Wally as a practicing attorney and expectant father, June having sold the old house to Beaver himself but living with him as a doting grandmother to Beaver's two small sons. Eddie Haskell runs his own contracting business and has a son, Freddie, who is every inch his father's son — right down to the dual-personality.

Feature film

1997's movie adaptation of the series starred Christopher McDonald as Ward, Janine Turner as June, Erik von Detten as Wally, and Cameron Finley as Beaver. It was panned by many critics, except for Roger Ebert, who gave it a three-star rating. It performed poorly at the box office, earning only $11,713,605. Barbara Billingsley, Ken Osmond and Frank Bank made cameo appearances in the film.

House
The Cleavers moved from 485 Mapleton Drive to 211 Pine Street, both in Mayfield, for the start of season three. In 1969, the house was reused for another Universal-produced television hit, Marcus Welby, M.D. This house can still be seen at Universal Studios, though the original façade was replaced in 1988 for the following year's The 'Burbs and sits in storage elsewhere on the Universal lot. The façade was replaced again for the 1996 Leave It to Beaver movie.

Home media
Universal Studios released the first two seasons of Leave It to Beaver on DVD in Region 1 in 2005/2006.

On January 26, 2010, it was announced that Shout! Factory had acquired the rights to the series (under license from Universal). They subsequently released the remaining seasons on DVD as well as a complete series box set.

On January 31, 2012, Shout! Factory released a 20 episode best-of set titled Leave It to Beaver: 20 Timeless Episodes.

Urban legends
In the mid 1970s, Mathers appeared on The Tomorrow Show hosted by Tom Snyder. Snyder pointed out that Mathers had not worked for a long time and that there was rumor going around that he had been killed "in the war in Southeast Asia".  Mathers replied that he had heard that rumor and that he had no idea how it got started. The earliest appearance of the story in print was in a student newspaper at the University of Kansas in 1972. The author later admitted that she had only heard the story from someone who had heard it a party in Omaha, Nebraska earlier that year.   The paper printed a retraction, but by then the story had spread throughout the U.S. The story was later attributed to a member of a defunct Omaha comedy improv group whose hobby was concocting outrageous stories and then convincing people they were true. "Beaver died in Vietnam" was a classic urban legend, memorable for its juxtaposition of idyllic 1950s imagery with the chaos and violence of the late 1960s.

Another urban legend was that actor Ken Osmond (Eddie Haskell) became porn star John Holmes. Holmes took Osmond's name and did several movies satirically under the name "Eddie Haskell".  It started because there was some facial resemblance between the two men, which porn distributors exploited by using the name Eddie Haskell in advertising Holmes's films. "It was a pain in my butt for eleven years," says Osmond, who brought a $25 million defamation suit against porn houses, producers and distributors. The suit went all the way to the California Supreme Court. The court ruled for Holmes, saying the name was protected as a satire. This case set a precedent in the matter, and is still referred to in other cases in California today.

 Notes 

General
 Applebaum, Irwyn, The World According to Beaver, TV Books, 1984, 1998..
 Bank, Frank, Call Me Lumpy: My Leave It To Beaver Days and Other Wild Hollywood Life, Addax, 2002.,.
 Colella, Jennifer, The Leave It to Beaver Guide to Life: Wholesome Wisdom from the Cleavers! Running Press, 2006.,.
 Ehrlich, John, and Richard A., 75 Aromatic Years of Leavitt & Pierce in Recollection of 31 Harvard Men, 1883-1958. Cambridge: Leavitt and Pierce Tobacconists, 1958.
 Genzlinger, Neil, "Golly, Beav, We’re Historic," The New York Times, New York: The New York Times Company, 5 Jun 2010, Internet website, . 
 Kassel, Michael B, "Mass Culture, History and Memory and the Image of the American Family", PhD dissertation, Michigan State University, 2005 65(9): 3537-A. DA3146050 613p.
 Keck, William, "Leave It to Jerry 'Beaver' Mathers, Tony Dow". USA Today, 2007 Oct 3, Internet website .
 Osmond, Ken, Eddie: The life and times of America's preeminent bad boy, 2014.
 Mathers, Jerry, ...And Jerry Mathers as "The Beaver", Berkley Boulevard Books, 1998.
 Shaffer, Jeffrey, "Epic Beaver Cleaver", Christian Science Monitor, 28 May 1999, 91:128.
 Todt, Ron, "Beaver College Announces New Name," ABC News, 6 Jan 2006, Internet website .
 Universal Studios, "Leave It to Beaver:" The Complete Series--Seasons 1-6'', Los Angeles: DVD Empire, beginning 2005.

External links 

Full episodes of Leave It to Beaver on TVLand.com (USA only)

 
1950s American sitcoms
1957 American television series debuts
1960s American sitcoms
1963 American television series endings
Television series set in the 1950s
Television series set in the 1960s
American Broadcasting Company original programming
American television series revived after cancellation
Black-and-white American television shows
CBS original programming
English-language television shows
Single-camera television sitcoms
Television series about children
Television series about families
Television series by Universal Television
Television shows adapted into films